Capital City Alternative School is an alternative school in Jackson, Mississippi operated by Jackson Public School District.
It serves "students in grades 4-12 who have been suspended/expelled from Jackson Public Schools for 10 days or longer."

2011 handcuffing litigation
On June 8, 2011, the Southern Poverty Law Center filed a federal class action lawsuit against the district over allegations that staff at Capital City Alternative School unlawfully shackled and handcuffed pupils.

References

External links

Schools in Jackson, Mississippi
Public high schools in Mississippi
Public middle schools in Mississippi
Public elementary schools in Mississippi
Alternative schools in the United States